Ski jumping at the 2016 Winter Youth Olympics was held at the Lysgårdsbakken in Lillehammer, Norway from 16 to 18 February.

Medal summary

Medal table

Events

Qualification
Each nation could send a maximum of 2 athletes (1 boy and 1 girl). The top scoring teams of the Marc Hodler Trophy Ski Jumping at the 2015 Junior Nordic World Ski Championships plus the hosts Norway were allowed to send the maximum of 2 athletes. Any remaining quota spots were distributed to nations not already qualified, with a maximum of one boy or girl from one nation. The quota limit was 45. The allocation of quotas is listed below.

Qualification summary

References

External links
Results Book – Ski jumping

 
2016 Winter Youth Olympics events
2016 in ski jumping
2016
Ski jumping competitions in Norway